The 1994 Lao League was the fifth season of top flight football in Laos. Lao Army FC from Vientiane won the championship, their fifth championship and fifth in a row, the only time a team from Laos has achieved this feat as of 2014.

References

Lao Premier League seasons
Laos
Laos
1